On Fire Baby (foaled  February 23rd, 2009) is an American Thoroughbred racehorse and the winner of the 2014 La Troienne Stakes.

Career

On Fire Baby's first race was on August 19th, 2011, at Ellis Park, where she came in first. Within two months of her career, she captured the 2011 Pocahontas Stakes, her first graded win. She then followed it up with a win at the 2011 Golden Rod Stakes.

To start 2012, she captured the 2012 Honeybee Stakes in March. Her next victory would not come until over a year later when she won the April 2013 Apple Blossom Handicap.

On Fire Baby took her first shot at the 2013 La Troienne Stakes, coming in 2nd place. She did not much see on track access until a 2nd place finish at the 2014 Apple Blossom Handicap, followed by her final win of her career at the 2014 La Troienne Stakes. She competed in her last race on September 6th, 2014, coming in 6th at the Locust Grove Stakes.

Pedigree

References

2009 racehorse births